Sebastián Prieto and Horacio Zeballos were the defending champions from the last edition of the tournament in 2009, but only Zeballos chose to defend his title.
He played alongside Máximo González. They won the title, defeating Guillermo Rivera-Aránguiz and Cristóbal Saavedra-Corvalán 6–3, 6–4 in the final.

Seeds

Draw

Draw

References
 Doubles Draw

Cachantun Cup - Doubles
2011 - Doubles